Patricia "Pat" Perkins (born September 3, 1953) is a Scottish-Canadian politician. Perkins served as the Conservative Member of Parliament for Whitby—Oshawa from 2014 to 2015. She was elected in a by-election held on November 17, 2014 following the death of Jim Flaherty.

Prior to being elected to the House of Commons of Canada, Perkins was a  Whitby, Ontario municipal councillor from 1997 until 2006 when she challenged incumbent mayor Marcel Brunelle, defeating him by less than 200 votes in the 2006 municipal election. Perkins served as mayor of Whitby for two terms from 2006 to 2014. She did not run for reelection to the mayoralty in the 2014 municipal election, due to the pending federal byelection.

Perkins was a member of the Standing Committee on Natural Resources and the Standing Committee on the Status of Women.

However, her term as an MP would be short-lived, as she was defeated in the federal election the following year in the redistricted riding of Whitby by Celina Caesar-Chavannes, whom she had earlier defeated in the by-election.

Electoral record

Federal

Mayor of Whitby, Ontario

2010

2006

References

External links
 Official website
 Pat Perkins - Parliament of Canada biography
 Pat Perkins - PARLINFO

1953 births
Conservative Party of Canada MPs
Living people
Mayors of Whitby, Ontario
Members of the House of Commons of Canada from Ontario
Women members of the House of Commons of Canada
Women mayors of places in Ontario
21st-century Canadian politicians
21st-century Canadian women politicians